Hydroxyethyl methyl cellulose is a gelling and thickening agent derived from cellulose.

The main characteristics of Hydroxyethyl Methyl Cellulose (HEMC) are:

1. Solubility: soluble in water and some organic solvents, HEMC can be dissolved in cold water, its maximum concentration is only determined by viscosity, solubility varies with viscosity, the lower the viscosity, the greater the solubility.

2. Salt resistance: HEMC  products are non-ionic cellulose ethers and are not polyelectrolytes, so in the presence of metal salts or organic electrolytes, they are relatively stable in aqueous solutions, but excessive addition of electrolytes can cause gelation and precipitation.

3. Surface activity: As the aqueous solution has surface activity function, it can be used as colloid protective agent, emulsifier and dispersant.

See also
 Methylcellulose
 Hydroxyethyl cellulose

References 

Cellulose
Cellulose ethers